Seth Achal Singh (5 May 1895 – 1971) was a prominent Indian independence activist and member of the 1st, 2nd, 3rd, 4th, and 5th Lok Sabha of India. He represented the Agra Lok Sabha constituency of Uttar Pradesh as a politician of the Indian National Congress.

Education & background
Achal Singh was educated at Agra Collegiate School, Cantonment Board College and then at Allahabad Agricultural Institute.

See also
List of members of the 15th Lok Sabha of India

References 

India MPs 1952–1957
India MPs 1957–1962
India MPs 1962–1967
India MPs 1967–1970
India MPs 1971–1977
Indian National Congress politicians
1895 births
Year of death missing
Lok Sabha members from Uttar Pradesh
People from Agra district
Politicians from Agra
Sam Higginbottom University of Agriculture, Technology and Sciences alumni
Indian independence activists
1971 deaths
Indian National Congress politicians from Uttar Pradesh